Inspiration is the ninth studio album by guitarist Yngwie Malmsteen, released on 14 October 1996. It is a tribute album consisting entirely of covers of various bands who influenced Malmsteen. Featured on vocals are Jeff Scott Soto, Mark Boals and Joe Lynn Turner, all of whom performed on Malmsteen's first four studio albums.

Track listing

Personnel
Yngwie Malmsteen – lead vocals (track 4), guitar, bass (except track 1), sitar, engineering, production
Jeff Scott Soto – lead vocals (tracks 1, 3, 6), engineering
Joe Lynn Turner – lead vocals (tracks 2, 8, 11)
Mark Boals – lead vocals (tracks 5, 7, 9, 10)
David Rosenthal – keyboard (tracks 1, 3, 10)
Mats Olausson – keyboard (tracks 2, 6)
Jens Johansson – keyboard (tracks 5, 8)
Anders Johansson – drums, engineering
Marcel Jacob – bass (track 1)
Chris Tsangarides – engineering
Keith Rose – engineering

Release history

Charts

Certifications and sales

References

External links
Inspiration, 1996 at yngwiemalmsteen.com
Inspiration (expanded set, disc 2) at yngwiemalmsteen.com
In Review: Yngwie J. Malmsteen "Inspiration" at Guitar Nine Records

Yngwie Malmsteen albums
1996 albums
Music for Nations albums
Pony Canyon albums
Spitfire Records albums
Covers albums
Tribute albums
Albums produced by Chris Tsangarides